The Exeter Ship Canal, also known as the Exeter Canal is a canal leading from (and beside) the River Exe to Exeter Quay in the city of Exeter, Devon, England. It was first constructed in the 1560s predating the "canal mania" period and is one of the oldest artificial waterways in the UK.

History
At the start of Exeter's history, the River Exe was tidal and navigable up to the city walls enabling it to be a busy port. In the 1270s or 1280s, the Countess of Devon, Isabella de Fortibus, built a weir across the river to power her mills (this weir is remembered in the name of the nearby suburb Countess Wear). This had the effect of cutting off Exeter's port from the sea and damaging its salmon fisheries. In 1290, trade with Exeter's port was restored, only to be blocked by a new weir built in 1317 by Hugh de Courtenay, 9th Earl of Devon (Isabella's cousin), who also built a quay at Topsham. Because of the blockages on the river, boats were forced to unload at Topsham and the earls were able to exact large tolls to transport goods to Exeter. For the next 250 years the city petitioned the King to have the waterway reopened, to no avail, until 1550 when Edward VI finally granted permission. However, it was by then too late because the river channel had silted up.

In 1563, Exeter traders employed John Trew of Glamorgan to build a canal to bypass the weirs and rejoin the River Exe in the centre of the city where a quay would be built. Work began in February 1564, and was completed in Autumn 1566 or early 1567. The canal had three locks with vertical gates – the first pound locks to be built in Britain. They accommodated boats up to 16 tonnes. This navigation was not very effective; it could not be entered at all states of the tide, and the double transfer of cargo over such a short distance made it uncompetitive with road transport. The weir that maintains the water level in the quay is still named "Trew's Weir" after the canal's builder.

In 1677 the canal was extended and the entrance was moved downstream to Topsham. In 1701 the canal was deepened and widened to allow the passage of ocean-going ships. At the same time the number of locks on the canal was reduced to one. Floodgates were also fitted to the canal entrance. These improvements led to the canal being highly successful until demand for access declined with the end of the wool trade in the early nineteenth century and later with the rise of the railways.

There were many notable failures to connect Exeter and the South West to the national canal and rail networks: The Grand Western Canal linking Exeter to Bristol (1796) was never completed; The Bristol & Exeter Railway link to the canal basin was postponed in 1832 and 1844; The South Devon Railway ran services to the canal from 1867, but by this time the canal was too small to attract the sizeable ocean-going vessels and the canal was taken over by its creditors for sixteen years. Use of the canal has declined gradually ever since.

20th century
In 1939 the canal was still carrying some 63,000 tons of material annually, and after the war it was still seen as a useful means of transporting goods to and from its basin at Haven Banks, opposite Exeter Quay. Planning for the city after The Blitz recommended that Turf Lock, the canal's junction with the estuary be deepened and enlarged to allow ships of 600 tons to pass.

In May 1944 the Countess Weir Road bridge (present day A379) was used in rehearsals for the D-Day attack on the 'Canal de Caen' (Pegasus Bridge) and the River Orne (Horsa Bridge), by the Second Battalion Oxfordshire and Buckinghamshire Light Infantry. A plaque acknowledging this is sited on the south side of the bridges on the east bank.

One of the last regular commercial uses of the canal was the tanker Esso Jersey, which served the Esso oil terminal. The ship was known as the Kieler from 1977, and was scrapped in 1984. It was the largest ship to use the canal, and delivered a final load of 244 tons of petrol in July 1971. Commercial traffic ceased after a coaster unloaded a cargo of timber in December 1973. However, the ship Countess Weir continued to use the canal. It had been built in 1963 as a sludge carrier, and was used to take sewage sludge from the Exeter sewage works out to sea, where it was dumped. It was originally named SW2, but became the Countess Weir in 1974. It was operated by the city council, who owned the treatment works, and had to be modified slightly in 1975, as it would not fit under the newly-constructed M5 motorway bridge. Ownership of the treatment works and the vessel passed to South West Water when the water industry was privatised in 1989, and dumping of sludge at sea ceased on 31 December 1998. The ship made a ceremonial visit to the canal in January 1999, after which it was sold.

The fall of commercial traffic in the 1960s coincided with the rise of leisure use of the canal. In the 1970s, the basin provided the backdrop for the filming of quayside activity in the historical drama The Onedin Line, even though the series was supposed to be set in Liverpool. In 2002 the future of the canal looked brighter when the city basin was included in a £24 million redevelopment scheme by Exeter Quay Developments, a consortium led by the construction company McAlpine. The quay area retains a mix of Georgian and Victorian buildings, repurposed for modern use, including the custom house which dates from 1681. The basin has seen a lot of redevelopment, including residential buildings in a mock warehouse style, with the older buildings finding new uses as antique shops, cafes, restaurants and studios. The canal basin itself is popular for a range of water sports, including canoeing, rowing and kayaking.

Throughout the year the Butts Ferry, a small hand powered passenger ferry, operates across the river by Exeter quay and canal basin during the day, though there is a footbridge close at hand. A ferry has been operating here since at least 1641.

Administration
The canal is owned by Exeter City Council. In 2017, they announced that it runs at a deficit, losing around £110,000 per year. They began negotiations with the Canal and River Trust in September 2016, with a view to transferring responsibility, but the talks were ended in December, with the council unhappy about the cost and likely outcomes of the action. They have since been looking at ways to increase the volume of boat traffic using the canal, but the major obstacles to this are the lifting bridge and	swing bridge at Countess Weir, which carry separate carriageways of the A38 road over the canal. Opening the bridges is only carried out infrequently, because of the disruption it causes to traffic on the A38, and each opening costs around £800 in administrative and staffing costs. The council and a support group, the Friends of Exeter Ship Canal, are looking at ways this could be overcome.

The Countess Weir swing bridge dates from 1936, while the lifting bridge was added in 1972, when the A38 was the main route to the West Country, prior to the building of the M5 motorway viaduct in 1977. Options being considered are to replace the two bridges with a single swing bridge or lift bridge, building a new bridge at a higher level to give much more clearance, and the construction of a drop lock, to lower the level of the waterway beneath the bridges. Both bridges were nearing the end of their operational life in 2019, and the Friends group have been campaigning for the new bridges to be built with increased headroom. There is a possibility that this could be funded by the government's Major Road Network scheme. Development plans were given a boost in 2021, when Exeter Quay became the United Kingdom's fourth Heritage Harbour, an award given by the Maritime Heritage Trust and National Historic Ships UK. Increasing the air draft of the bridges to  would enable many more coastal boats to use the harbour, including those catching fish and shellfish.

See also

Canals of Great Britain
History of the British canal system

Bibliography

References

External links

Canals in Devon
Exeter
Transport in Exeter
Shipping in England
Ship canals
Canals opened in 1567
1567 establishments in England
Industrial archaeological sites in Devon